Owen County is the name of two counties in the United States:

Owen County, Indiana
Owen County, Kentucky